Howdendyke is a hamlet in the East Riding of Yorkshire, England.

Howdendyke forms part of the civil parish of Kilpin.

It lies on the north bank of the River Ouse and has port facilities run by PD Ports.

References

Villages in the East Riding of Yorkshire